Järve is a village in Toila Parish, Ida-Viru County in northeastern Estonia.

Before the 2017 Administrative Reform, the Järve was the administrative centre of Kohtla Parish.

References

 

Villages in Ida-Viru County
Castles of the Teutonic Knights
Kreis Wierland